Bremridge Wood formerly part of the Domesday Book estate of Bremridge near South Molton, Devon, England, is the site of an Iron Age enclosure or hill fort. The earthwork is situated in woodland on a Hillside forming a promontory above the River Bray to the West of the Town at approx 175 Metres above Sea Level.

References

Hill forts in Devon
Forests and woodlands of Devon